Euskirchen (Ripuarian: Öskerche) is a town in North Rhine-Westphalia, Germany, capital of the district Euskirchen. While Euskirchen resembles a modern shopping town, it also has a history dating back over 700 years, having been granted town status in 1302. As of December 2007, it had a population of 55,446. Its local football club is called TSC Euskirchen.

Culture
Parts of the ancient town wall, and three of its defensive towers, are still standing. Tourists are also attracted to Euskirchen due to the proximity of two large cities, Cologne and Bonn, to the northeast, and the hills of the Eifel region to the south. 
It is also the birthplace of Emil Fischer, born 1852, who won the Nobel Prize in Chemistry in 1902. The local theatre in The Emil-Fischer-Gymnasium offers a wide variety of cultural events. The City Forum and the Parkhotel Euskirchen also contribute to the town's cultural offerings.

The word Euskirchen means Kirche auf der Aue (“church on riverside lowland”). The Martinskirche is the oldest church in Euskirchen.

Biggest local sports clubs in Euskirchen are the TSC Euskirchen, LGO Euskirchen/Erftstadt and Lauf Club Euskirchen. Sports facilities are the Erftstadion, gym Ohm-Mirgel, Jahnhalle, Willi-Maurer-Halle, gym Emil-Fischer-Gymnasium, Sportanlage Im Auel (since 2021 Heinz-Flohe-Sportpark) and gym Marienschule.

Twin towns – sister cities

Euskirchen is twinned with:
 Basingstoke, England, United Kingdom (1986)
 Charleville-Mézières, France (1964)

Industry and Commerce
Euskirchen has a diversified and balanced economic structure and can therefore provide jobs for a large catchment area. Euskirchen is a rural town with large, open fields serving agricultural purposes. Sugar beets are widely cultivated, and Euskirchen has been home to a sugar factory (Pfeifer & Langen) since 1879. Until a few decades ago, a further important branch of industry was cloth manufacturing, but this was unable to survive due to competition from large international corporations.

Well-known industrial enterprises (e.g. Procter & Gamble, Miele) are located within the town's industrial and commercial sites. These can also offer attractive possibilities to new enterprises. The town's central location and good road and rail links to the international transport network are important factors in this context.

The two largest industrial and commercial sites in Euskirchen, accounting for a total of 21,000 jobs between them, are:
 IPAS (“IndustriePark Am Silberberg”) with four million m², of which 3.6 m² million lie within the boundary of the town of Euskirchen 
 EURO-Park (located between Euskirchen and Roitzheim) with 1.5 million m².

At IPAS, in the districts Wüschheim/Großbüllesheim, the consumer goods corporation Procter & Gamble has a production plant as well as a warehouse from which it conducts its logistics operations all over the world. At EURO-Park the German company Nestlé Purina PetCare (pet food) and the “T-Versand” division of Deutsche Telekom have their headquarters, the sugar factory Pfeifer & Langen is based at EURO-Park and the building materials chain Mobau (“Moderner Baubedarf”) – which has now merged into Eurobaustoff – was established.

Immediately adjacent to “Industriepark IPAS” is the "PrimeSite Rhine Region", an area reserved exclusively for major investors. With a total area of 205 hectares, which is equivalent to about 300 football fields, the "PrimeSite Rhine Region" is the first unbuilt and available industrial and commercial site of this size in North Rhine-Westphalia to date. Around 85 percent (177 hectares) of the site lies within the boundary of the town of Euskirchen, while about 15 percent (28 hectares) belong to the municipality of Weilerswist. The already well developed large area will be reserved up to 2019 for space-intensive large-scale projects in excess of 80 hectares. It is being marketed internationally by the state economic development agency NRW.INVEST.

Notable people
 Emil Fischer (1852–1919), chemist, 1902 Nobel Laureate in Chemistry

 Karl Eschweiler (1886–1936), a Catholic theologian and religious philosopher
 Willi Graf (1918–1943), member of the resistance group White Rose
 Heinz Flohe (1948–2013), former Germany national football team player (world champion 1974)
 Silke Rottenberg (born 1972), former Germany national football team player
 Bettina Wiegmann (born 1971), former Germany national football team player
 Sonja Fuss (born 1978), former Germany national football team player
 Sebastian Schlemmer (born 1978), actor
 Andreas Wolff (born 1991), handball goalkeeper
 Erdoğan Yeşilyurt (born 1993), footballer
 Lukas Klünter (born 1996), Germany national football team player

References

External links

 
Towns in North Rhine-Westphalia
Euskirchen (district)